Pauline Marie Elisa Thys [-Lebault] (1835–1909) was a French composer and librettist. She was born in Paris, her father was the opéra comique composer Alphonse Thys (1807–1879). Initially she composed salon romances and light piano music, before she turned to writing music for the stage including operettas, opéra-comiques, and operas, some of which to her own libretto.

In 1877, she was the founder of the Association des femmes artistes et professeurs. In 1883, she became a Chevalier de l'Ordre des Palmes académiques.

Selected works
Stage
La Pomme de Turquie, operetta, 1 act (1857)
Quand Dieu est dans le ménage, Dieu le garde, operetta (1860)
La Perruque du Bailli, operetta (1860)
Le Roi de Cocagne, opéra-comique, 2 acts (libretto: Pierre Jean Baptiste Choudard Desforges) (1862)
Manette, opéra-comique (1865)
La Congiura di Chevreuse, opéra (1876)
Le Cabaret du Pot-cassé, operetta, 2 acts (1878)
Le Fruit vert, opéra-comique, 3 acts
Nedgeya, operetta (libretto: P. Nemo) (1880)
Le Mariage de Tabarin (French version of her own La Congiura di Chevreuse), opéra-comique, 3 acts (libretto by Thys) (1885)
Judith, tragédie lyrique

Songs
Chanson créole (1856)
Le Chant du gondolier (1856)
Le Souvenir (1856)
Les Larmes sont soeurs (1858)
Ma Pendule (1858)
Les Chants de la sirène (1859)
Six Fables de La Fontaine for solo voice (1861, reprinted 1872); includes 1. L'Amour et la folie; 2. Le Satyre et le passant; 3. Les Médecins; 4. L'Huître et les plaideurs; 5. La Montagne qui accouche; 6. La Femme noyée.
Tes vingt ans (1861)
La Neige tombe sur nos toits (1862)
Le Pays de Cocagne (1862)
Jeunes filles et papillons (1864)
Qu’en dites-vous, Monsieur Genniès (1862, reprinted 1872)
Quand on est vieux (1863)
Mignonne, voici le jour (1884)

Piano
Air havanais (1875)

References

1836 births
1909 deaths
19th-century classical composers
19th-century French composers
Women opera composers
French classical composers
French women classical composers
French opera composers
19th-century women composers